{{DISPLAYTITLE:C10H14N2}}
The molecular formula C10H14N2 (molar mass: 162.23 g/mol, exact mass: 162.1157 u) may refer to:

 Anabasine
 Nicotine
 Phenylpiperazine
 Rivanicline